Oligomenorrhea is infrequent (or, in occasional usage, very light) menstruation. More strictly, it is menstrual periods occurring at intervals of greater than 35 days, with only four to nine periods in a year. Menstrual periods should have been regularly established before the development of infrequent flow. The duration of such events may vary.

Causes
Oligomenorrhea can be a result of prolactinomas (adenomas of the anterior pituitary). It may be caused by thyrotoxicosis, hormonal changes in perimenopause, Prader–Willi syndrome, and Graves' disease.

Endurance exercises such as running or swimming can affect the reproductive physiology of female athletes. Female runners, swimmers and ballet dancers either menstruate infrequently in comparison to non-athletic females of comparable age or exhibit amenorrhea. A more recent study shows that athletes competing in sports that emphasise thinness or a specific weight exhibit a higher rate of menstrual dysfunction than either athletes competing in sports with less focus on these or control subjects.

Breastfeeding has been linked to irregularity of menstrual cycles due to hormones that delay ovulation.

People with polycystic ovary syndrome (PCOS) are also likely to have oligomenorrhea. PCOS is a condition in which excessive androgens (male sex hormones) are released by the ovaries. People with PCOS show menstrual irregularities that range from oligomenorrhea and amenorrhea, to very heavy, irregular periods. The condition affects about 6% of premenopausal females.

Eating disorders can result in oligomenorrhea. Although menstrual disorders are most strongly associated with anorexia nervosa, bulimia nervosa may also result in oligomenorrhea or amenorrhea. There is some controversy regarding the mechanism for the menstrual dysregulation, since amenorrhea may sometimes precede substantial weight loss in some anorexics.

See also
 Amenorrhea: a total cessation of the menstrual period
 Menorrhagia: unusually heavy periods

References

External links

Menstrual disorders